Scioglyptis loxographa is a species of moth of the family Geometridae. It is found in Australia, including Tasmania.

References

Boarmiini
Moths of Australia
Moths described in 1917